Aroostook National Wildlife Refuge is located on part of the former Loring Air Force Base, in Aroostook County, Maine. It was established in 1998, when  were transferred from the United States Air Force to the United States Fish and Wildlife Service. It is close to the Aroostook State Park where visitors can camp, hike, fish, and cross-country ski. In a portion of Maine where the landscape is dominated by agricultural crops such as potatoes and broccoli, Aroostook National Wildlife Refuge protects valuable wildlife habitat. The variety of habitat types attracts a diversity of wildlife species.

It occurs in the towns of Limestone, Caswell, Connor, and Caribou.

Wildlife 
Numerous wildlife species occur on the refuge. Mammals commonly observed on the refuge include Moose, white-tailed deer, black bears, river otters, mink, short-tailed weasels, red foxes, bobcats, coyotes, fisher, Canada lynx, muskrats, beavers, raccoons, snowshoe hares, and red squirrels. Waterfowl that use the refuge wetlands include American black ducks, wood ducks, green-winged teal, hooded mergansers, and several others; Canada geese may be seen on East Loring Lake and the Little Madawaska River upstream from the dam during periods of spring and fall migration. Common loons may be observed on the refuge's larger wetlands, and bald eagles are commonly seen.

The majority of the refuge is forested upland, which offers nesting habitat for migratory songbirds. Warblers such as the black-throated green, Canada, bay-breasted, Cape May, and blackburnian are common in the spring and summer. These "Neotropical migrants" breed here and winter in Mexico, the Caribbean, and Central and South America. Refuge grasslands provide habitat for upland sandpipers, bobolinks, and savannah sparrows. Woodcock use grassy areas for courtship and upland forested areas for nesting. Many other species of birds occur on the refuge, as do numerous amphibians, reptiles, fish, insects, and other invertebrates.

The refuge contains numerous Cold War era concrete bunkers that reportedly housed early nuclear weapons prior to the closure of the Air Force Base.  Now the vegetated tops of those bunkers serve as habitat for a variety of wildlife species.

Visitors are welcome to use the refuge for recreational activities, such as hiking, bicycling, wildlife photography, cross-country skiing, and snowshoeing. The refuge contains several roads and hiking trails, some of which are groomed in the winter for cross-country skiing and snowshoeing. The refuge has a visitor center and store near the main entrance to the refuge.

References

External links 

U.S. Geological Survey Map at the U.S. Geological Survey Map Website. Retrieved February 2, 2023.

National Wildlife Refuges in Maine
Protected areas of Aroostook County, Maine
Protected areas established in 1998
Limestone, Maine
Wetlands of Maine
Landforms of Aroostook County, Maine